Lambung Mangkurat Museum is a museum in  Jalan Ahmad Yani 36, Banjarbaru, South Kalimantan, Indonesia. The museum has a notable collection of artifacts related to the Banjar and Dayak peoples, with many items being excavated from archaeological sites all around Kalimantan. It is also home to an array of ancient Hindu objects.

References

Banjarbaru
Buildings and structures in South Kalimantan
Tourist attractions in South Kalimantan
Ethnographic museums in Indonesia